The Hand of Faith is a nugget of fine-quality gold that was found by Kevin Hillier using a metal detector near Kingower, Victoria, Australia on 26 September 1980. Weighing 875 troy ounces (27.21 kg, or 72 troy pounds and 11 troy ounces), the gold nugget was only 12 inches below the surface, resting in a vertical position. The announcement of the discovery occurred at a press conference, attended by the Premier of Victoria Dick Hamer, in Melbourne on 8 October 1980. Kovac's Gems & Minerals were appointed agents for the sale of the huge nugget, by the gold nugget finder, Kevin Hillier. It was sold to the Golden Nugget Casino Chain for over a million dollars.

The Hand of Faith is currently on public display at Golden Nugget Biloxi in Biloxi, Mississippi, United States. Replicas of the nugget are on display at a number of Golden Nugget casinos, including Golden Nugget Laughlin and Golden Nugget Atlantic City.

It was initially incorrectly stated as weighing only 720 ozt, but after correction, the new calculation was 874.82 ozt. This explains why some publications continue to give an incorrect weight. It is still regarded as the largest modern nugget found by a metal detector, anywhere in the world. Dimensions are 47 cm × 20 cm × 9 cm (18.5 in x 7.9 in x 3.5 in). The sale price was supposedly around $US1m.

The nugget was the second largest nugget found in Australia since the 1930s. There were numerous nuggets found during the Victorian gold rush era, commencing in the 1850s, that were far larger.

See also
List of gold nuggets by size

References

External links
Hand of Faith Website
Hand of Faith on Facebook
Hand of Faith at the Golden Nugget Casino
See Real Gold at Golden Nugget in Atlantic City
Golden Nugget Takes Its Show, And Its Nugget, On the Road

Gold mining
Gold nuggets
Metal detecting finds